Agrococcus baldri is a Gram-positive bacterium from the genus Agrococcus which has been isolated from air in the Virgilkapelle.

References

Microbacteriaceae
Bacteria described in 2002